Mike Fellows may refer to:

 Mike Fellows (musician) (born 1959), American musician
 Mike Fellows (politician) (1957–2016), politician with the Montana Libertarian Party

See also
 Michael Fellows, American computer scientist